Claus Mørch Jr. (born 18 February 1947) is a Norwegian fencer. He competed in the team épée event at the 1972 Summer Olympics. His father, Claus Mørch Sr. fenced for Norway at the 1948 Summer Olympics and his daughter, Margrete Mørch, competed at the 2000 Summer Olympics.

References

External links
 

1947 births
Living people
Norwegian male épée fencers
Olympic fencers of Norway
Fencers at the 1972 Summer Olympics
Sportspeople from Oslo
20th-century Norwegian people